Samuel Victor Cox (born 22 December 1964) is a former Australian Liberal National politician who was the member of the Legislative Assembly of Queensland for Thuringowa from 2012 to 2015. He was educated at the Anglican Church Grammar School.

He defected to Pauline Hanson's One Nation in January 2017, and announced that he would contest the next Queensland state election for One Nation in the seat of Burdekin, but was unsuccessful. Cox later unsuccessfully ran for Mayor of Townsville in the 2020 Queensland local government elections. He contested the seat of Burdekin in the 2020 Queensland state election as a Katter's Australian Party candidate, and was again unsuccessful.

References

1964 births
Katter's Australian Party politicians
Living people
Liberal National Party of Queensland politicians
Members of the Queensland Legislative Assembly
People educated at Anglican Church Grammar School
21st-century Australian politicians
Pauline Hanson's One Nation politicians